On January 3, 1883, Democrat Joseph Wheeler was elected to finish the term of Greenback William M. Lowe in the United States House of Representatives.  He represented . He was seated January 15, 1883, for the term ending March 3, 1883.

Background 
In the 1878 United States House of Representatives elections, Lowe was elected to serve in the 46th United States Congress.  He lost re-election to Wheeler in 1880, but successfully contested the election and was reseated June 3, 1882.  Lowe then died October 12, 1882.

Results 
  Joseph Wheeler (Democratic) 62.14%
 John B. McClellan (Independent) 37.86%

Next term 
Wheeler had not been elected to the next term on November 7, 1882, which was won by fellow Democrat Luke Pryor.

See also 
 1882 United States House of Representatives elections#Special elections

References 
 , citing Dubin's United States Congressional Elections, 1778-1997 The Official Results, pg. 255

Alabama 1883 08
Alabama 1883 08
1883 08
Alabama 08
United States House of Representatives 08
United States House of Representatives 1883 08